Complete results for Men's Slalom competition at the 2013 World Championships. It ran on February 17 at 10:00 local time (1st run) and 13:30 local time (2nd run), the last race of the championships. 100 athletes from 57 nations competed while 139 athletes from 59 countries competed in the qualification race on February 16.

Results

Race
The first run was started at 10:00 and the second run at 13:30.

Qualification
The first run was started at 10:00 and the second run at 13:30.

References

Slalom, men's